The 1983–84 Wake Forest Demon Deacons men's basketball team represented Wake Forest University as a member of the Atlantic Coast Conference during the 1983–84 season. Led by head coach Carl Tacy, the team finished the season with an overall record of 23–9 (7–7 ACC) and reached the Elite Eight of the NCAA tournament as No. 4 seed in the Midwest region.

Roster

Schedule and results 
The Demon Deacons were an uncanny 6–1 in overtime games, including a win over #1 seed DePaul in the Sweet Sixteen.

|-
!colspan=9 style=| Regular season

|-
!colspan=9 style=| ACC Tournament

|-
!colspan=9 style=| NCAA Tournament

Rankings

References 

Wake Forest Demon Deacons men's basketball seasons
Wake Forest
Wake Forest
1983 in sports in North Carolina
1984 in sports in North Carolina